Anolis altavelensis, the Alto Velo gracile anole or Noble's anole, is a species of lizard in the family Dactyloidae. The species is found on Alto Velo Island in the Dominican Republic.

References

Anoles
Reptiles of the Dominican Republic
Endemic fauna of the Dominican Republic
Reptiles described in 1933
Taxa named by Gladwyn Kingsley Noble
Taxa named by William Grey Hassler